The decade of the 1120s in art involved some significant events.

Events

Works
 1121: Unknown artist sculpts Prince Shōtoku in Hōryū-ji
 1124: Li Tang paints Wind in the Pines Amid Ten Thousand Valleys

Births
 1127: Lin Tinggui – Chinese painter of the Southern Song Dynasty (died 1189)
 1120: Zhao Boju - Chinese landscape and flower painter of the Southern Song Dynasty (died 1182)

Deaths
 1126: Cai Jing - Chinese government official and calligrapher (born 1047)
 1120: Fujiwara no Sadazane - Japanese calligrapher during the Heian period (born 1076)

References

Art
Decades of the 12th century in art